Ghiasi (also Romanized as Ghīās̄ī) is a village in Fasarud Rural District, in the Central District of Darab County, Fars Province, Iran. At the 2006 census, its population was 518, in 139 families.

References 

Populated places in Darab County